Silifke (Seleukeia) is a town and district in south-central Mersin Province, Turkey,  west of the city of Mersin, on the west end of Çukurova.

Silifke is near the Mediterranean coast, on the banks of the Göksu River, which flows from the nearby Taurus Mountains, surrounded by attractive countryside along the river banks.

Etymology
Silifke was formerly called Seleucia on the Calycadnus — variously cited over the centuries as Seleucia [in] Cilicia, Seleucia [in, of] Isauria, Seleucia Trachea, and Seleucia Tracheotis —. The city took its name from its founder, King Seleucus I Nicator. The ancient city of Olba was also within the boundaries of modern-day Silifke. The modern name is derived from the Greek Σελεύκεια, which is pronounced Selefkia in Greek.

History

Antiquity
Located a few miles from the mouth of the Göksu River, Seleucia was founded by Seleucus I Nicator in the early 3rd century BC, one of several cities he named after himself. It is probable that there were already towns called Olbia (or Olba) and Hyria and that Seleucus I merely united them giving them his name. The city grew to include the nearby settlement of Holmi (in modern-day Taşucu) which had been established earlier as an Ionian colony but being on the coast was vulnerable to raiders and pirates.  The new city up river was doubtless seen as safer against attacks from the sea so Seleucia achieved considerable commercial prosperity as a port for this corner of Cilicia (later named Isauria), and was even a rival of Tarsus.

Cilicia thrived as a province of the Romans, and Seleucia became a religious center with a renowned 2nd century Temple of Jupiter. It was also the site of a noted school of philosophy and literature, the birthplace of peripatetics Athenaeus and Xenarchus. The stone bridge was built by the governor L. Octavius Memor in 77 AD. Around 300 AD Isauria was established as an independent state with Seleucia as the capital.

Christianity
Early Christian bishops held a Council of Seleucia in 325, 359, and 410.  Seleucia was famous for the tomb of the virgin Saint Thecla of Iconium, converted by Saint Paul, who died at Seleucia, the tomb was one of the most celebrated in the Christian world and was restored several times, among others by the Emperor Zeno in the 5th century, and today the ruins of the tomb and sanctuary are called Meriamlik. In the 5th century the imperial governor (comes Isauriae) in residence at Seleucia had two legions at his disposal, the Legio II Isaura and the Legio III Isaura. From this period, and perhaps later, dates the Christian necropolis, west of the town, which contains many tombs of Christian soldiers. According to the Notitia Episcopatuum of the Patriarchate of Antioch, in the 6th century, the Metropolitan of Seleucia had twenty-four suffragan sees.

In 705 Seleucia was captured by the Arab armies of Islam and was recovered by the Byzantines. Thus by 732 nearly all the ecclesiastical province of Isauria was incorporated into the Patriarchate of Constantinople; henceforth the province figures in the Notitiae of the Patriarchate of Constantinople, but under the name of Pamphylia.

In the Notitiae of Leo VI the Wise (ca. 900) Seleucia had 22 suffragan bishoprics; in that of Constantine Porphyrogenitus (ca 940) it had 23. In 968 Antioch again fell into the power of the Byzantines, and with the Province of Isauria, Seleucia was allocated to the Patriarchate of Antioch. We know of several metropolitans of this see, the first of whom, Agapetus, attended the Council of Nicaea in 325; Neonas was at the Council of Seleucia in 359; Symposius at the Council of Constantinople in 381; Dexianus at the Council of Ephesus in 431; Basil, a celebrated orator and writer, whose conduct was rather ambiguous at the Second Council of Ephesus and at the beginning of the Council of Chalcedon in 451; Theodore was at the Fifth Ecumenical Council in 553; Macrobius at the Sixth Ecumenical Council and the Council in Trullo in 692.

No longer a residential see, Seleucia in Isauria has been included in the list of titular sees of the Catholic Church, which has made no new appointments of a titular bishop to this eastern see since the Second Vatican Council.

Turkish period
In the 11th century, the city was captured by the Seljuk Turks; they met with resistance and in 1137, Seleucia was besieged by Leon of Cilician Armenia. During this period of struggle between Armenians, Byzantines, Crusaders, and Turks, a stronghold was built on the heights overlooking the city. On June 10, 1190, the Emperor Frederick Barbarossa was drowned trying to cross the Calycadnus, near Seleucia during the Third Crusade.

In the 13th century Seleucia was in the possession of the Hospitallers, who lost it to the Karamanid Principality in the second half of the 13th century, and then it ended up in the hands of the Ottomans under general Gedik Ahmet Pasha in 1471.

Until 1933, Silifke was the capital of İçel Province, but then, İçel and Mersin provinces were merged. The merged province took the name of İçel but with its administrative centre at Mersin. Finally in 2002 the name of İçel was replaced with that of Mersin.

Economy
The economy of the district depends on agriculture, tourism and raising livestock. The town of Silifke is as a market for the coastal plain, which produces beans, peanuts, sesame, banana, orange, lemon, cotton, grapes, lentils, olives, tobacco, and canned fruits and vegetables. An irrigation project located at Silifke supplies the fertile Göksu delta. In recent years there has been a large investment in glasshouses for producing strawberries and other fruit and vegetables in the winter season.

Silifke is also an industrial town, well-connected with other urban areas and producing beverages, chemicals, clothes, footwear, glass, plastics, pottery, and textiles.

Climate
Silifke has a hot-summer Mediterranean climate (Köppen climate classification Csa) with hot and dry summers and mild and wet winters.

Administrative structure

Towns
 Akdere
 Arkum
 Atakent
 Atayurt
 Narlıkuyu
 Silifke
 Taşucu
 Uzuncaburç
 Yeşilovacık

Villages

Main sights
 The caves of "Heaven and Hell" ('Cennet ve Cehennem'), which have collapsed in two places revealing deep holes in the ground.
Narlıkuyu is an attractive village, where people from Mersin come to eat fish and enjoy the seaside.
 The town of Silifke has many well preserved ancient ruins including:
 The prominent remains of the castle high on a rock above the town,
 The city walls,
 A large water tank (Tekir ambarı) cut into the rock,
 An extensive necropolis of rock-cut tombs with inscriptions.

Life and culture
The Turkmen community of Silifke has a strong tradition of folk music and dance including songs such as The Yogurt of Silifke (where the dancers imitate the actions of making yogurt) and another one where they wave wooden spoons about as they dance.

The cuisine includes breakfast of leaves of unleavened bread (bazlama) with a dry sour cottage cheese (çökelek) or fried meats. Many other dishes feature bulgur wheat. The annual Silifke Yoghurt Festival takes place in May.

See also
Other Seleucias
Acacius of Caesarea
Assyrian Church of the East
Aya Tekla Church
Council of Rimini
Cyprus Memorial Cemetery in Silifke
Çukurova
Dana Adası
Eudoxius of Antioch
Işıkkale
Karakabaklı
Gökkale
Meydankale
Narlıkuyu
Seleucid Empire
Silifke Museum
Sinekkale
Uzuncaburç
Silifke Castle
Silifke Göksu Anadolu Lisesi

References

External links

 District governor's official website 
 District municipality's official website 
 Silifke Guide and Photo Album
  susanoğlu
 Extensive photo site of Silifke, the temple and nearby sights
  Carefully documented photographic survey and plan of Silifke Castle

Çukurova
Populated places in Mersin Province
Seleucid colonies in Anatolia
Catholic titular sees in Asia
Districts of Mersin Province